La Estampida, known colloquially as Glorieta de los Caballos (Horses Roundabout), is an outdoor sculpture installed in Guadalajara, in the Mexican state of Jalisco.

References

External links

 

Horses in art
Outdoor sculptures in Guadalajara
Statues in Jalisco